Earl Cochrane is a Canadian soccer executive, who has previously worked the Canadian Soccer Association, D.C. United, and Toronto FC.

Playing career
Cochrane played university soccer at Carleton University. He was a four-time OUA All-star and a two time all-Canadian defender. Cochrane also played professionally in Asia.

Management
Cochrane worked for the Canadian Soccer Association as the National Teams Manager from January 2001 before becoming Director of Communications in 2005. He was also Director of Communications of D.C. United for two years before returning to Canada. Cochrane was an original member of Toronto FC, joining in July 2006 as the club's Manager of Team Operations. Cochrane was named TFC Academy Director in April 2007. He was appointed interim general manager of Toronto FC on Sept 14, 2010, following Mo Johnston's removal. He became Director of Team and Player Operations following the appointment of Toronto FC's new management team in January, 2011. Shortly after the firing of general manager Kevin Payne, Cochrane was also fired.

References

External links
 Toronto FC Academy staff

Toronto FC
Canadian soccer players
Canadian expatriate soccer players
Living people
Penang F.C. players
Association football defenders
Year of birth missing (living people)
Carleton Ravens men's soccer players
20th-century Canadian people